Rachel Moret (born 23 November 1989) is a Swiss table tennis player.

She is currently representing her country at the 2021 Summer Olympic Games in Tokyo.

References 

1989 births
Living people
People from Morges
Swiss female table tennis players
Olympic table tennis players of Switzerland
Table tennis players at the 2020 Summer Olympics
Sportspeople from the canton of Vaud